The 4 × 10 kilometre cross-country skiing event was the only relay event of the men's cross-country skiing programme at the 1984 Winter Olympics, in Sarajevo, Yugoslavia. It was the eleventh appearance of the 4 × 10 km relay in the Winter Olympics. The competition was held on Thursday, 16 February 1984, at Veliko Polje, Igman.

It was the first time since 1964 that Sweden won the gold medal in the event. It was also the second gold medal won by Gunde Svan at the games, and the first of two won by Thomas Wassberg. The Mongolian team, who had dead-heated for 15th, was disqualified after Pürejavyn Batsükh tested positive for steroids.

Results

References

External links
Official Olympic Report

Men's cross-country skiing at the 1984 Winter Olympics
Men's 4 × 10 kilometre relay cross-country skiing at the Winter Olympics